Deoghar is a village in the Maval taluka of Pune district in Maharashtra State, India.

References 

Villages in Pune district